Tassaduq Ahmad, born Tassaduq Ahmad Chowdhury, MBE was a British-Bangladeshi politician, social worker, and activist.

Early life 
Ahmad was born on 2 April 1923 in Golapganj Upazila, Sylhet District, Assam, British India. His father, Madris Ahmad Chowdhury, was a bureaucrat. In 1943, he removed Chowdhury from his name due to the name being a Zamindar title. He was the General Secretary of All Assam Muslim Students Federation and campaigned in the 1947 Sylhet Referendum which resulted in Sylhet District being separated from Assam and joined to East Bengal (present Bangladesh).

Career 
Ahmad worked as a journalist in the Daily Pakistan Observer (which became The Bangladesh Observer. He also worked at the Daily Sangbad. 

Ahmad was involved in the 1952 Bengali Language movement and had to flee East Pakistan for Great Britain after the government tried to detain him for his involvement in the movement.

Ahmad published two newspapers in England, Desher Dak and Eastern News. He opened a restaurant called the Ganges in Gerrard Street, Soho, London. He was given an MBE, Member of British Empire, by the British government in 1989.

Death 
Ahmad died on 8 December 2001.

References 

1923 births
2001 deaths

People from Golapganj Upazila
British people of Bangladeshi descent
Bangladeshi diaspora
British Muslims